Batlle, alternatively spelled Batle, is a surname of Catalan origin found in Catalan-speaking territories and countries that received immigrants from Catalonia, Valencia and the Balearic Islands. The Batlle Surname comes from the Latin word "bátulos" that in the Catalan language is applied to the president of a municipal consistory. In other veguerias (Medieval administrative jurisdiction) of Catalonia it meant: Representative of the King. It is of particular importance in Uruguayan political history. See also batlle in Catalan Wikipedia (:ca:Batlle).

It can refer to:

Lorenzo Batlle y Grau, President of Uruguay from 1868 to 1872.
José Batlle y Ordóñez, President of Uruguay from 1903 to 1907 and 1911 to 1915, son of Lorenzo Batlle y Grau.
Lorenzo Batlle Pacheco, Uruguayan politician and son of José Batlle y Ordóñez.
César Batlle Pacheco, Uruguayan politician and son of José Batlle y Ordóñez.
Rafael Batlle Pacheco, Uruguayan journalist and son of José Batlle y Ordóñez.
Luis Batlle Berres, President of Uruguay from 1947 to 1951 and 1955 to 1956, nephew of José Batlle y Ordóñez.
Jorge Batlle Ibáñez, President of Uruguay from 2000 to 2005, son of Luis Batlle Berres.
Carolina Ache Batlle, Uruguayan politician, current Deputy Minister of Foreign Relations of Uruguay from 2020, grand niece of Jorge Batlle Ibáñez.
Julio Vega Batlle, Dominican writer
Federico Antún Batlle, Dominican politician
Manuel Arturo Peña Batlle, Dominican historian, diplomat, politician and lawyer.

Catalan-language surnames